Verkhnevilyuysky District (Üöhee Bülüü uluuha) is an administrative and municipal district (raion, or ulus), one of the thirty-four in the Sakha Republic, Russia. It is located in the western central part of the republic and borders with Vilyuysky District in the east, Gorny District in the southeast, Olyokminsky District in the south, Suntarsky and Nyurbinsky Districts in the west, and with Olenyoksky District in the northwest. Its administrative center is the rural locality (a selo) of Verkhnevilyuysk. Population:  21,383 (2002 Census);  The population of Verkhnevilyuysk accounts for 29.8% of the district's total population.

Geography
The main rivers in the district include the Vilyuy, the Tyukyan, and the Tyung.

Climate

History
The district was established on February 10, 1935.

Demographics
As of the 1989 Census, the ethnic composition was as follows:
Yakuts: 94.5%
Russians: 3%
Evenks: 0.3%
Evens: 0.2%
other ethnicities: 2%

Economy
The economy of the district is mostly based on agriculture.

Inhabited localities

Divisional source:

*Administrative centers are shown in bold

See also 
 Lena Plateau

References

Notes

Sources

Districts of the Sakha Republic